The Liberal Party (literally "Party of Liberals") was a major political party in Greece during the early-to-mid 20th century. It was founded in August 1910 by Eleftherios Venizelos and went on to dominate Greek politics for a considerable number of years until its decline following the Second World War. Among its most well-known members, apart from Venizelos, were Alexandros Papanastasiou, Nikolaos Plastiras, Georgios Papandreou and Konstantinos Mitsotakis.

Since its founding, the party's emblem had been the anchor, Venizelos had brought with him from Crete.

History 
Founded as the Xipoliton ("barefoot") party in Crete (then an autonomous region of the Ottoman Empire), its early leaders were Kostis Mitsotakis (grandfather of Konstantinos Mitsotakis) and Eleftherios Venizelos. After the annexation of Crete by Greece, Venizelos moved to Athens and turned the party into a national one, under the Fileleftheron (liberal) name in 1910. For the following 25 years, the fate of the party would be tied to that of Venizelos. The party was legally disbanded after the failed coup attempt led by Nikolaos Plastiras of 1935, although the organization remained active.

During World War II, a Greek government in exile was formed in Cairo, Egypt, with the assistance of the British. The government was formed almost entirely of prominent Liberals, including Georgios Papandreou and Sophoklis Venizelos, even as King George remained the official head of state.

The party was reformed after the war. By the 1950s, the Liberal Party had lost much of its support and it was eventually merged into the Centre Union, which went on to win the 1963 and 1964 elections. Throughout its existence, the Liberal Party sought to hinder the rise of the Communist Party of Greece which was the only real opposition to the Liberals on their most important electoral basis (the refugees of the New Lands, i.e., lands acquired by Greece following the Balkan Wars and World War I), sometimes with the use of anti-communist legislation.

The Liberal Party merged into Center Union (Enosi Kentrou) in 1961, under the leadership of Georgios Papandreou.

In 1980, Eleftherios Venizelos' grandson Nikitas founded a new party under the same name that claims to be the continuation of the original party, see Liberal Party (Greece, modern).

Ideology
Representing the centrist elements of Greek society, and supported by the middle class and the populations of the New Lands, its main competitor was the People's Party. Increasingly the Liberal Party became associated with anti-monarchism and during the 1920s the Liberals established a republic which they led for most of its short-lived existence. The party carried the ideological legacy of Venizelism.

Electoral results

Prominent members
(Name, highest office as a party member, year)
Eleftherios Venizelos, leader, Prime Minister (1910)
Georgios Kafantaris, Prime Minister (1924)
Andreas Michalakopoulos, Prime Minister (1924)
Sophoklis Venizelos, Prime Minister (1944)
Georgios Papandreou, Prime Minister (1946)
Konstantinos Mitsotakis, MP (1946)

Leaders
Eleftherios Venizelos, 1910–1936
Themistoklis Sophoulis, 1936–1948
Sophoklis Venizelos, 1948–1961

See also
Venizelism
Eleftherios Venizelos
History of Modern Greece

References

Political parties established in 1910
Defunct political parties in Greece
Defunct liberal political parties
Liberal parties in Greece
Liberalism in Greece
Eleftherios Venizelos
1910 establishments in Greece